Minneola is a city in Lake County, Florida, United States. The population was 9,403 at the 2010 census. As of 2019, the population recorded by the U.S. Census Bureau is 12,595. It is part of the Orlando–Kissimmee–Sanford Metropolitan Statistical Area. The Minneola tangelo is named after the city.

Geography

Demographics

As of the census of 2009, there were 9,139 people, 1,929 households, and 1,516 families residing in the city. The population density was 883.51 people per sq. mile (685.8/km). The racial makeup of the city was 88.70% White, 5.06% African American, 0.28% Native American, 1.32% Asian, 0.04% Pacific Islander, 2.94% from other races, and 1.66% from two or more races. Hispanic or Latino of any race were 10.93% of the population.

There were 1,929 households, out of which 42.4% had children under the age of 18 living with them, 65.7% were married couples living together, 8.5% had a female householder with no husband present, and 21.4% were non-families. 16.6% of all households were made up of individuals, and 4.6% had someone living alone who was 65 years of age or older. The average household size was 2.81 and the average family size was 3.14.

In the city, the population was spread out, with 29.7% under the age of 18, 5.9% from 18 to 24, 37.2% from 25 to 44, 18.5% from 45 to 64, and 8.7% who were 65 years of age or older. The median age was 33 years. For every 100 females, there were 96.5 males. For every 100 females age 18 and over, there were 95.7 males.

The median income for a household in the city was $46,250, and the median income for a family was $52,645. Males had a median income of $36,231 versus $23,569 for females. The per capita income for the city was $20,721. About 3.7% of families and 6.1% of the population were below the poverty line, including 9.1% of those under age 18 and 7.5% of those age 65 or over.

Notable people

 Ryan Villopoto, four-time supercross and five-time motocross champion

Government and infrastructure

Lake County Sheriff's Office has the Minneola District offices in Minneola.

Education

Lake County Schools operates area public schools.

References

External links

 City of Minneola Official Website

Cities in Lake County, Florida
Greater Orlando
Cities in Florida